Tonik may refer to:

Tonik (bank), a bank in the Philippines
Tonik, a fabric made of mohair and wool
Tonik Energy, a former energy supplier acquired by Scottish Power

See also
 Tonic (disambiguation)